Agency Creek is a stream in the U.S. state of Idaho. It is a tributary of the Lemhi River.

Agency Creek was named for an Indian agency near its course.

Course
Agency Creek rises on the west side of Lemhi Pass and then flows westerly to join the Lemhi River at Tendoy, Idaho.

Watershed
Agency Creek drains  of area, receives about 20.2 in/year of precipitation, has a wetness index of 290.19, and is about 32% forested.

References

Rivers of Lemhi County, Idaho
Rivers of Idaho